Steven Kelly (born 24 September 1952) is a Canadian sports shooter. He competed in the men's 25 metre rapid fire pistol event at the 1976 Summer Olympics.

References

1952 births
Living people
Canadian male sport shooters
Olympic shooters of Canada
Shooters at the 1976 Summer Olympics
Sportspeople from Ottawa
Pan American Games medalists in shooting
Pan American Games silver medalists for Canada
Shooters at the 1979 Pan American Games
20th-century Canadian people